The SPLM Youth League (abbreviated SPLM-YL) is a youth organization in South Sudan, the youth wing of the ruling Sudan People's Liberation Movement. As of 2017 Emmanuel Lubari Joseph is the chairperson of SPLM-YL.

References

Youth wings of political parties in South Sudan